Vicente Hernández Cabrera (born 20 April 1991) is a Spanish triathlete. He competed in the men's event at the 2016 Summer Olympics. He is part of ECS Triathlon club.

References

External links
 

1991 births
Living people
Spanish male triathletes
Olympic triathletes of Spain
Triathletes at the 2016 Summer Olympics
Place of birth missing (living people)
European Games competitors for Spain
Triathletes at the 2015 European Games